In telecommunication, a digital transmission group is a group of digitized voice or data channels or both with bit streams that are combined into a single digital bit stream for transmission over communications media.  

Digital transmission groups usually are categorized by their maximum capacity, not by a specific number of channels. However, the maximum digital transmission group capacity must be equal to or greater than the sum of the individual multiplexer input channel capacities.

See also
Digital Signal 1
E-carrier
Plesiochronous Digital Hierarchy

References

Multiplexing